Andriy Lyashenko (born 11 June 1998) is a Ukrainian professional footballer who plays as a midfielder for Epitsentr Dunaivtsi.

Lyashenko is a product of the FC Volyn Youth Sportive School System. Then he signed a professional contract with Volyn Lutsk in the Ukrainian Premier League.

He made his debut in the Ukrainian Premier League for Volyn on 24 July 2016, playing in the match against Dnipro.

On 11 July 2022 he signed for LNZ Cherkasy.

In February 2023 he moved to Epitsentr Dunaivtsi.

References

External links
Profile at Official FFU Site (Ukr)

Living people
1998 births
Ukrainian footballers
Ukrainian expatriate footballers
Expatriate footballers in Slovakia
Ukrainian expatriate sportspeople in Slovakia
Expatriate footballers in Kyrgyzstan
Ukrainian expatriate sportspeople in Kyrgyzstan
Association football midfielders
FC Volyn Lutsk players
FC DAC 1904 Dunajská Streda players
FC Rukh Lviv players
Ukrainian Premier League players
Ukrainian First League players
Ukrainian Second League players